Brusnika is a Russian real estate developer that specialises in residential high-rise construction. The company was founded in 2004. Its headquarters are located in Yekaterinburg with projects concentrated in Tyumen, Novosibirsk, Yekaterinburg, Surgut, Vidny and Kurgan.

History 

The company commenced operations in 2004 with the name "Partner-Invest", part of holding "Partner", which integrated several enterprises in Tyumen in the sphere of construction, production and commerce. 
In October 2015 the company was rebranded with the aim of unifying  all the subsidiaries in 5 cities under a single name. In Novosibirsk, for instance, the company operated as Sibakademstroy (with no change to the name of the local developer taken over in 2010).    

Since 2005, the company has begun development activities and formation of a land bank. In 2010, the company launched the second project of the integrated development of the microdistrict "Yevropeyskiy" (eng. "European"). In 2011, Brusnika bought a "Sibacademstroy" company.

In June 2018 in collaboration with Sberbank, the company pioneered project financing  with escrow accounts. The same year its national credit quality was evaluated as BBB+ (stable development forecast) according to Expert RA. 

In 2019 Brusnika was reorganised as a corporate company with subsidiaries in Yekaterinburg, Novosibirsk, Tyumen, Surgut and Moscow. It was granted the national credit rating at BBB+(RU) (stable development forecast) by ACRA and was rated among the top five developers in Russia according to Forbes. 

In 2020 the company issued its debut bonds on the Moscow Exchange, and was granted the status of a strategic developer in Russia and successfully retained its credit quality at BBB+. The same year, jointly with DOM.RF, the developer embarked on the first leased housing project in Yekaterinburg. 

In 2021 ACRA promoted Brusnika’s rating to A− (RU) with stable development forecast and rated its bonds at A− (RU). The company has launched mobile manufacturing to develop residential area "Pshenitsa" (Eng. Wheat), a new residential area in Novosibirsk and branched out into in-house production of aluminium-wooden windows in Yekaterinburg This year the urban villa in the European Quarter of Tyumen was awarded an International BREEAM Awards 2021 prize in the category of Accommodation - Buildings at the Stage of Design.

In this way in 2021 Brusnika issued two bonds on the Moscow Exchange for a total of 10 billion rubles. ACRA also rated all issues of the Brusnika’s bonds at A− (RU).

In March 2022 ACRA confirmed the company’s status and its bonds at А-(RU) with stable development forecast too.

References

External links
official site

Construction and civil engineering companies of Russia
Companies established in 2004